C.S. Marítimo may refer to:

 C.S. Marítimo, a football club from Funchal, Madeira
 C.S. Marítimo (futsal)
 C.S. Marítimo (handball)
 C.S. Maritimo (volleyball)